The Indiana Klan was a branch of the Ku Klux Klan, a secret society in the United States that organized in 1915 to promote ideas of racial superiority and affect public affairs on issues of Prohibition, education, political corruption, and morality. It was strongly white supremacist against African Americans, Chinese Americans, and also Catholics and Jews, whose faiths were commonly associated with Irish, Italian, Balkan, and Slavic immigrants and their descendants. In Indiana, the Klan did not tend to practice overt violence but used intimidation in certain cases, whereas nationally the organization practiced illegal acts against minority ethnic and religious groups.

The Indiana Klan rose to prominence beginning in the early 1920s after World War I, when white Protestants felt threatened by social and political issues, including changes caused by decades of heavy immigration from southern and eastern Europe. By 1922 the state had the largest organization nationally, and its membership continued to increase dramatically under the leadership of D.C. Stephenson. It averaged 2,000 new members per week from July 1922 to July 1923, when he was appointed as the Grand Dragon of Indiana. He led the Indiana Klan and other chapters he supervised to break away from the national organization in late 1923.

Indiana's Klan organization reached its peak of power in the following years, when it had 250,000 members, an estimated 30% of native-born white men. By 1925 over half the elected members of the Indiana General Assembly, the Governor of Indiana, and many other high-ranking officials in local and state government were members of the Klan. Politicians had also learned they needed Klan endorsement to win office.

That year Stephenson was charged and convicted for the rape and murder of Madge Oberholtzer, a young schoolteacher. His vile behavior caused a sharp drop in Klan membership, which decreased further with his exposure to the press of secret deals and the Klan's bribery of public officials. Denied pardon, in 1927 Stephenson began to talk to the Indianapolis Times, giving them lists of people who had been paid by the Klan. Their press investigation exposed many Klan members, showed they were not law-abiding, and ended the power of the organization, as members dropped out by the tens of thousands. By the end of the decade, the Klan was down to about 4,000 members and finished in the state. Efforts by some to revive it in the period of the 1960s and 1970s were not successful.

Formation
In 1920, Imperial Wizard William J. Simmons of Atlanta, Georgia chose Joe Huffington to start an official Indiana chapter of the Ku Klux Klan. Huffington left for Indiana and set up his first headquarters in Evansville.

Huffington met D.C. Stephenson, a fellow war veteran with a background in Texas and Oklahoma, who quickly became one of the leading members of the chapter. Stephenson was active in the local Democratic Party and had run unsuccessfully in the Democratic Congressional primary of 1922 as an anti-prohibition candidate. He was more successful with recruiting and organizing new members. Like other agents, Stephenson got to keep a portion of the entrance fees, and began to amass wealth. Entrance in the Klan cost $10, plus dues, and the recruiter personally kept $4 of each registration. It is estimated that Stephenson made between two and five million dollars from his position in the Klan. Southern Indiana had already had significant vigilante activity among White Cap groups, dating back to the American Civil War.

Stephenson was an active recruiter. He initially stressed the concept of the Klan as a fraternal society and brotherhood, organized for civic activism, to help the poor and defend morality. He gained the support of many ministers and church congregations for these appeals to populist issues, and the Klan grew rapidly in Indiana.

Activities
D.C. Stephenson moved during 1920 to Evansville, Indiana, where he worked for a retail coal company. He joined the Democratic Party and in 1922, ran unsuccessfully for a Democratic Congressional nomination. He was said to have already "married and abandoned two wives" before settling in Evansville.

Joseph M. Huffington, whom the Ku Klux Klan had sent from Texas as an agent for organizing in Evansville, recruited Stephenson to the group's inner circle. The historian Leonard Moore characterized them as both young men on the make. The Evansville Klavern became the most powerful in the state, and Stephenson soon contributed to attracting numerous new members. More than 5400 men, or 23 percent of the native-born white men in Vanderburgh County, ultimately joined the Klan.

Building on the momentum, Stephenson set up a base in Indianapolis, where he helped create the Klan's state newspaper, Fiery Cross and he quickly recruited new agents and organizers, building on news about the organization. Protestant ministers were offered free memberships. From July 1922 to July 1923, nearly 2,000 new members joined the Klan in Indiana each week. Hiram Wesley Evans, who led recruiting for the national organization, maintained close ties to state leaders throughout 1921–1922 and especially to Stephenson, as Indiana by then had the largest state organization. Stephenson backed Evans in November 1922 when he unseated William J. Simmons as Imperial Wizard of the national KKK. Evans had ambitions to make the Klan a political force in the country.

Klansmen in the Indiana General Assembly passed a bill in 1922 that created a Klan Day at the Indiana State Fair, complete with a nighttime cross burning. Governor Warren T. McCray vetoed the bill, beginning his public resistance to the Klan; he was the highest-ranking official to oppose them. The same year Edward L. Jackson, a Klan member who had been elected as the Secretary of State, granted the Klan a state charter. McCray demanded the charter be revoked because the leaders of the Klan did not reveal themselves to sign the document. Jackson refused to revoke the charter. Stephenson ordered Jackson to offer McCray a $10,000 bribe to try to end his anti-Klan stance. McCray was personally wealthy and he refused the bribe.

In November 1922, Hiram Wesley Evans took power as the new Imperial Wizard in Atlanta, with the support of Stephenson. As a reward and in recognition of Stephenson's recruiting success, Evans appointed Stephenson as Grand Dragon of the Indiana Klan and head of recruiting for seven states north of Mississippi during a 1923 Fourth of July gathering of the Klan in Kokomo, Indiana, with more than 100,000 members and their families attending. Stephenson said, 

My worthy subjects, citizens of the Invisible Empire, Klansmen all, greetings. It grieves me to be late. The President of the United States kept me unduly long counseling on matters of state. Only my plea that this is the time and the place of my coronation obtained for me surcease from his prayers for guidance.

Encouraged by his success, in September 1923, Stephenson severed his ties with the existing national organization of the KKK, and formed a rival KKK made up of the chapters he led. That year Stephenson changed his affiliation from the Democratic to the Republican Party, which predominated in Indiana and much of the Midwest. He notably supported Republican Edward L. Jackson, rumored to be a Klan member, when he ran (successfully) for governor in 1924. With its high rate of membership, the Indiana Klan became influential in the Indiana politics and a public endorsement from the organization leadership could practically guarantee victory at the polls. This led to many Indiana politicians at all levels of government to join the Klan in order to gain their support. The Klan became so powerful, and Stephenson so influential, that by 1925 he began to brag, saying "I am the law in Indiana."

The Klan's rhetoric was anti-Catholic and anti-Semitic in these years, as rapid expansion of industrial jobs in Indiana and other Midwestern states brought tens of thousands of immigrants from southern and eastern Europe. As these immigrants were mainly of Catholic or Jewish faith, the Klan alleged that they were behind secret plots to overthrow the government and exterminate Protestants. Its lesser enemy, however, were African Americans. The Indiana Klan stressed more social issues than racism, as it promised to uphold moral standards, help enforce Prohibition, and end political corruption. The Klan also publicly attacked adulterers, gamblers, and undisciplined youths.

The Klan members wanted to end authorization for Catholic parochial schools, and remove all Catholic influence from public schools. The Klan was unable to attain either goal, but attained support for their agenda from key leaders. Samuel Ralston delivered an anti-Catholic speech in 1922 which the Klan reproduced and spread across the state. With their support, he was elected to the United States Senate in 1923.

Unable to bring Governor McCray to their side, leaders in the Indiana Klan worked to uncover dirt on McCray to force him out of office. They uncovered loans solicited by McCray in a questionable way. Because the solicitations were sent by mail, they were subject to federal mail fraud laws. The Klan leaders used their influence to have McCray tried, convicted, and imprisoned for mail fraud, forcing him to resign from office in 1924. Edward Jackson was elected to the governor's office that fall.

At the height of its power the Klan had over 250,000 members, which was over 30% of state's white male population. The highest concentration was in cities in the central part of the state. Klan membership was discouraged in some parts of the state; in New Albany, for instance, city leaders denounced the Klan and discouraged residents from joining. Other cities, including Indianapolis, were almost completely controlled by the Klan, and election to public office was impossible without their support. Street fights occurred in Indianapolis between the Klan members and minority groups.  Statewide, estimates of native white male Indiana Klan membership ranged from 27 to 40%.

The Klan had a large budget, based on a percentage of membership fees and dues. With more than 50,000 dues-paying members in Indianapolis, the Klan had access to tens of millions of dollars. A large part of these funds went to helping the poor, but millions were also poured into bribing public officials, paying off enemies, purchasing weapons, and contributing to political campaigns.

Scandal
In 1925, Stephenson, the head of the Indiana Klan, met Madge Oberholtzer, the head of the state's commission to combat illiteracy. During the night of the inaugural ball of Republican Governor Edward L. Jackson, she was abducted from her home, taken to the Indianapolis train station, and held in a private railroad car. On the train to Hammond, Stephenson repeatedly raped her and bit her. In Hammond, she pleaded the need to get to a drug store, where she secretly ate mercury tablets and bi-chloride.  Using the illness which was brought on by the poisons as an excuse, she begged Stephenson to release her.  He took her back to Indianapolis and held her at his place.  After Oberholtzer refused to marry him several days later, he had her returned to her home and secretly placed in bed.  When her parents found her, the young woman was nearly dead.  Taken to the hospital, Oberholtzer died about a month later. She told her story in detail to several witnesses. Stephenson was immediately arrested and charged with second-degree murder.  The attending doctor, who testified during the trial, said that Oberholtzer's wounds appeared as if a cannibal had chewed her.  The prosecution claimed that the wounds and the mercury had both caused the death of Oberholtzer. Stephenson was convicted and the State Supreme Court upheld the decision in Stephenson v. State.  He was sentenced to prison, serving time until 1956, when he was granted parole.

 
Denied a pardon by Governor Jackson, who he had supported during his campaign for governor, Stephenson began to talk to reporters for the Indianapolis Times and expose many of the high-profile members of the Klan in 1926. Stephenson gave the reporters the names of politicians and officials who the Klan had bribed, and the names of politicians and officials who had accepted money from the Klan. The mayor of Indianapolis, John Duvall, was jailed for thirty days and later, he was convicted of bribery. Numerous commissioners and other local leaders across the state were charged with bribery and forced to resign, stemming from their acceptance of support from the Klan. Governor Jackson was charged with bribery for his role in attempting to influence McCray. The court found that the charges against Jackson were true, but it judged him not guilty, because the statute of limitations on his crimes had expired. He ended his term and did not seek re-election. He was disgraced and never held public office again. Many other leaders of the Klan were arrested and tried on charges of conspiracy to bribe public officials.

The press, which won a Pulitzer Prize for its investigation, revealed that more than half of the members of the Indiana General Assembly were Klan members. The Stephenson rape case and the ensuing bribery scandal both destroyed the Klan's image as the defender of women and justice. Members of the Klan withdrew from the organization by the tens of thousands.

The historian James Madison cautions that the Klan 

cannot be dismissed as either an aberration or as simply the insidious appeal of a fanatical few. Nor should the Klan be seen as thoroughly dominating the state and accurately reflecting racist, violent, or provincial beliefs shared for all time by all Hoosiers.

Although some people tried to revive the Klan in the 1960s and 1970s, when changing social values, the Vietnam War, urban riots and industrial restructuring caused widespread economic and social disruption, the organization never regained either the members or the power which it held during the 1920s.

From 1929 through 1933, Roy Davis lived in Jeffersonville, Indiana. Davis was a founding member of the 1915 KKK and he would later become the National Imperial Wizard of the Original Knights of the KKK in 1959.

See also

 History of Indiana
 History of the Ku Klux Klan in New Jersey
 Indiana White Caps
 Ku Klux Klan
 Ku Klux Klan in Inglewood, California
 List of Ku Klux Klan organizations
 Tulsa race massacre

Notes

Sources

Leonard J. Moore, Citizen Klansmen: The Ku Klux Klan in Indiana, 1921-1928, Chapel Hill: University of North Carolina Press, 1997

External links
"Indiana and the Ku Klux Klan" , Center for History (Indiana)
The Stephenson Trial: Internal Klan Conflicts Linked to Downfall of Second Klan in Indiana by Lindsay Dunn

Resources on the Ku Klux Klan in Indiana, Indiana State Library 
Ku Klux Klan: A Secret History, written and produced by Bill Brummel, History Channel, 31 May 2003.

 
Organizations based in Indiana
Crimes in Indiana
Political scandals in Indiana
1915 establishments in Indiana
Anti-Catholicism in the United States